Corydioidea is a superfamily of insects in the order Blattodea, the cockroaches and termites. It contains two extant families, Corydiidae and Nocticolidae, comprising about fifty genera and two hundred and fifty species, along with the extinct family Liberiblattinidae. Members of this superfamily are found worldwide, mostly in hot, arid habitats.

References

Cockroaches
Insect superfamilies